The stellated rhombic dodecahedral honeycomb is a space-filling tessellation (or honeycomb) in Euclidean 3-space made up of copies of stellated rhombic dodecahedron cells. Six stellated rhombic dodecahedra meet at each vertex. This honeycomb is cell-transitive, edge-transitive and vertex-transitive.

See also
Yoshimoto Cube

References

 George Hart, Stellations
 Exploring a complex space-filling shape, Exploratorium
 

Honeycombs (geometry)